Bryotropha phycitiniphila is a moth of the family Gelechiidae. It is found in south-eastern Kazakhstan.

The wingspan is 13–14 mm for males and about 12 mm for females. The forewings of the males are pale brownish grey, mottled with pale white and ochreous. The hindwings are grey. Females are slightly darker. Adults have been recorded on wing from June to July.

Etymology
The species is named after the circumstances under which some males were collected, being attracted to the pheromones of a female specimen of Pyla fusca.

References

Moths described in 2005
phycitiniphila
Moths of Asia